Łękno, officially known as Łekno, and until 1945 as Westend, is a municipal neighborhood of the city of Szczecin, Poland, situated on the left bank of Oder river, north-west of the districts of Stare Miasto and Śródmieście. In 2020, it was inhabited by 3065 people.

References 

Lekno